Hemonia rotundata is a moth of the family Erebidae. It was described by Snellen in 1879. It is found on Java, Bali, Borneo, Peninsular Malaysia, the Philippines and Sulawesi. The habitat consists of primary and secondary forests.

The larvae possibly feed on the leaves of Acacia mangium.

References

Nudariina
Moths described in 1879